Daniel A. Lilker (born October 18, 1964) is an American semi-retired musician best known as a bass player, but also guitarist, pianist, drummer and vocalist. He was the bassist for the thrash metal band Nuclear Assault and was a founding member of Anthrax with Scott Ian. Lilker was then playing rhythm guitar and recorded bass guitar and co-wrote on their first album, Fistful of Metal. He also founded crossover band Stormtroopers of Death with Scott Ian and Charlie Benante (from Anthrax), and Billy Milano (Anthrax roadie, M.O.D. singer). He also plays bass with Brutal Truth, Exit-13, Malformed Earthborn, The Ravenous, Overlord Exterminator, Venomous Concept, Crucifist, Nokturnal Hellstorm, Nunfuckritual and Extra Hot Sauce.

Lilker played on Holy Moses' 1994's No Matter What's the Cause. He is known for his fast, guitar-like riffing through heavy distortion.  Lilker has been a columnist with Zero Tolerance Magazine since the publication's inception in 2005. In 2009, it was reported that Chicago journalist Dave Hofer was writing a biography of Lilker.

Lilker formed United Forces with Stormtroopers of Death bandmate Billy Milano as their singer in 2012.

In January 2014, Lilker announced his plans to retire from being a full-time recording and touring musician. He also announced that Brutal Truth would break up on his 50th birthday. However, Lilker remained as a member of Nuclear Assault, who released new material in 2015 for the EP Pounder, and had continued performing live sporadically until their breakup in 2022.

Discography

Extra Hot Sauce

Nuclear Assault

Brutal Truth

Anthrax

Stormtroopers of Death

The Ravenous

Venomous Concept

Holy Moses

References

1964 births
Anthrax (American band) members
Death metal musicians
American heavy metal bass guitarists
American male bass guitarists
Jewish American musicians
Jewish heavy metal musicians
Living people
People from Bayside, Queens
People from Queens, New York
Guitarists from New York City
American male guitarists
American multi-instrumentalists
20th-century American guitarists
Stormtroopers of Death members